(Parliamentary) Committee on Defence (FöU) is a parliamentary committee in the Swedish Riksdag. The committee's areas of responsibility concern the military (insofar as such matters do not belong to the preparation of any other committee), the role of the population in defense policies (total defense), along with coordination inside the total defense. The committee also treats questions regarding the coast guard.

The committee's speaker is Peter Hultqvist from the Social Democratic Party and the vice-speaker is Sven-Olof Sällström from the Sweden Democrats since 2022.

List of speakers for the committee

List of vice-speakers for the committee

References

External links
Riksdag – Försvarsutskottet Riksdag – Defence Committee

Committees of the Riksdag